The short worm eel (Moringua abbreviata) is an eel in the family Moringuidae (spaghetti eels). It was described by Pieter Bleeker in 1863, originally under the genus Aphthalmichthys. It is a tropical marine eel found in the Indo-Pacific, including Laccadives, the Ryukyu Islands, the Philippines, the Marshall Islands, Samoa, and Indonesia. It is known to inhabit reefs. Males can reach a maximum total length of 33 cm.

References

Moringuidae
Fish described in 1863